Arthur T. Buss (July 14, 1911 – March 23, 1998) was a professional American football tackle in the National Football League (NFL). He played four seasons for the Chicago Bears and the Philadelphia Eagles.  In 1936, Buss was traded by the Bears to the Eagles during the inaugural NFL Draft in exchange for first overall selection, Jay Berwanger.

References

1911 births
1998 deaths
People from St. Joseph, Michigan
Players of American football from Michigan
American football tackles
Michigan State Spartans football players
Chicago Bears players
Philadelphia Eagles players